Gérard Roland (born 1954) is a Belgian economist, and a professor of economics and political science at the University of California, Berkeley. He graduated from the Free University of Brussels in 1988. His early work was on the political economy of communism. After 1990, he became one of the world's most renowned and influential scholars in transition economics. He is a member of the Executive and Supervisory Committee (ESC) of CERGE-EI.

Selected works
 "The Design of Reform Packages under Uncertainty", (with M. Dewatripont), American Economic Review, 1995, vol 83, pp. 107–1223
 Transition and Economics: Politics, Markets and Firms. MIT Press 2000

External links
 Roland's webpage in Berkeley

1954 births
Living people
Belgian economists
University of California, Berkeley College of Letters and Science faculty
Université libre de Bruxelles alumni